Deer Grove is a village in Whiteside County, Illinois, United States. The population was given as 45 in the 2010 census, down from 48 in 2000.

Geography
Deer Grove is located at  (41.607822, -89.691534).

Demographics

As of the census of 2000, there were 48 people, 21 households, and 12 families residing in the village. The racial makeup of the village was 91.67% White, 2.08% African American, 6.25% from other races. Hispanic or Latino of any race were 8.33% of the population.

There were 21 households, out of which 28.6% had children under the age of 18 living with them, 52.4% were married couples living together, 4.8% had a female householder with no husband present, and 38.1% were non-families. 33.3% of all households were made up of individuals, and 23.8% had someone living alone who was 65 years of age or older. The average household size was 2.29 and the average family size was 2.92.

In the village, the population was spread out, with 22.9% under the age of 18, 6.3% from 18 to 24, 25.0% from 25 to 44, 22.9% from 45 to 64, and 22.9% who were 65 years of age or older. The median age was 40 years. For every 100 females, there were 71.4 males. For every 100 females age 18 and over, there were 76.2 males.

The median income for a household in the village was $44,167, and the median income for a family was $43,750. Males had a median income of $32,500 versus $26,250 for females. The per capita income for the village was $16,651. There were no families and 5.7% of the population living below the poverty line, including no under eighteens and none of those over 64.

References

Villages in Illinois
Villages in Whiteside County, Illinois